Specie may refer to:
 Coins or other metal money in mass circulation
 Bullion coins
 Hard money (policy)
 Commodity money
 Specie Circular, 1836 executive order by US President Andrew Jackson regarding hard money
 Specie Payment Resumption Act

See also
Species (disambiguation)